Save Me (stylized in all caps) is the first extended play by American rapper Future, released through Freebandz and Epic Records on June 7, 2019. It debuted at number five on the US Billboard 200.

Background
Save Me was announced on June 5, 2019, via Future's Instagram account, and later confirmed as an EP by Apple Music.

Critical reception

At Metacritic, which assigns a normalized rating out of 100 to reviews from professional publications, Save Me received an average score of 63, based on six reviews, indicating "generally favorable reviews".

Reed Jackson of Pitchfork said, "[Future's] latest EP proves he's still a master of melancholic detail, but thematically and sonically, the Atlanta superstar has hit a wall". Christopher Weingarten of Rolling Stone wrote, "...this seven-song companion piece, coming less than five months on its heels, is something else: a fascinating "what if" scenario, a more experimental Future working within modern rap techniques and pushing their boundaries to the blurry edges". HipHopDX critic Cherise Johnson said, "SAVE ME, opposed to previous collaborative EPs such as 2016's Purple Reign with Metro Boomin, feels incomplete for it's lacking the divine energy felt from previous Future projects". In a mixed review, Exclaim!s Calum Slingerland stated: "Aforementioned moments of experimentation show a continued development of Future's "Hendrix" alter ego, but there's something to be said for getting to know him over a longer runtime." 

Spectrum Cultures Daniel Bromfield wrote the following: "Future has long been one of rap's most consistent artists, but for the first time since his early shots at stardom, he sounds confused." Lucy Shanker of Consequence saying "There's no denying Future's ability to constantly curate content, but perhaps with a little more time and focus, Save Me could have been significantly better".

Commercial performance
Save Me debuted at number five on the US Billboard 200 with 42,000 album-equivalent units (including 5,000 pure album sales) in its first week.

Track listing

Notes
  signifies an uncredited co-producer
 "Xanax Damage" is stylized as "XanaX Damage"

Sample credits
 "Shotgun" contains a sample from "Promise", written by Ciara Harris, Jasper Cameron, Jamal Jones, and Elvis Williams, performed by Ciara.
 "Extra" contains a sample from "One Unread", written by Atupele Ndisale, Amber Olivier, David Patino, and Christopher Wood, performed by Amber Olivier.

Personnel
Credits adapted from Tidal.

 Bryan Anzel – recording (tracks 1, 7), engineering (track 3)
 Detail – recording (track 4), mixing (track 4)
 Manny Marroquin – mixing (tracks 1, 6, 7)
 Fabian Marasciullo – mixing (tracks 2, 3, 5)
 Glenn Schick – mastering (all tracks)
 Eric Manco – engineering (all tracks), recording (track 3)
 Fxxxxy – engineering (all tracks), recording (tracks 2, 5, 6)
 Mike Synphony – engineering assistant (tracks 3, 4, 7)

Charts

References

2019 debut EPs
Future (rapper) albums
Albums produced by Detail (record producer)